TJ Valašské Meziříčí (Tělovýchovná jednota Valašské Meziříčí) is a polisports club and football club located in Valašské Meziříčí, Czech Republic. It currently plays in Czech Fourth Division - Divize F, which is the fourth tier of the Czech football system.

Historical names
 1925 SK Valašské Meziřčí
 1949 Sokol Valašské Meziříčí
 1953 Tatran Valašské Meziříčí
 1958 TJ Valašské Meziříčí

References

External links
  

Football clubs in the Czech Republic
Association football clubs established in 1925
Vsetín District